Aryan Lakra (born 13 December 2001) is an Indian-born cricketer who plays for the United Arab Emirates national cricket team. He was named as the captain of the United Arab Emirates squad for the 2020 Under-19 Cricket World Cup. He took twelve wickets in the six matches he played in the tournament.

In December 2020, he was one of ten cricketers to be awarded with a year-long part-time contract by the Emirates Cricket Board. In January 2021, he was named in the UAE's One Day International (ODI) squad to play against Ireland. In March 2022, Lakra was named in the UAE's ODI squad for the 2022 United Arab Emirates Tri-Nation Series. In August 2022, he was named in United Arab Emirates' One Day International (ODI) squad for round 15 of the 2019–2023 ICC Cricket World Cup League 2 in Scotland. He made his ODI debut on 11 August 2022, against the United States. Later the same month, he was named in United Arab Emirates' T20I squad for the 2022 Asia Cup qualifier. He made his T20I debut on 22 August 2022, against Singapore.

References

External links
 

2001 births
Living people
Emirati cricketers
United Arab Emirates One Day International cricketers
United Arab Emirates Twenty20 International cricketers
People from Sonipat
Cricketers from Haryana
Indian emigrants to the United Arab Emirates
Indian expatriate sportspeople in the United Arab Emirates